Chico Hamilton Quintet featuring Buddy Collette (rereleased as Spectacular!) is an album by drummer and bandleader Chico Hamilton's Quintet featuring multi-instrumentalist Buddy Collette, released on the Pacific Jazz label. The album was recorded in 1955 with one side recorded live and the other recorded in the studio.

Reception

The AllMusic review by Scott Yanow states: "A chamber jazz unit that hinted in spots at classical music, this cool jazz band was quite popular for a few years."

Track listing
 "A Nice Day" (Buddy Collette) - 2:53
 "My Funny Valentine" (Richard Rodgers, Lorenz Hart) - 4:16
 "Blue Sands" (Collette) - 6:30
 "The Sage" (Fred Katz) - 3:34
 "The Morning After"  (Chico Hamilton) - 2:07
 "I Want to Be Happy" (Vincent Youmans, Irving Caesar) - 2:10
 "Spectacular" (Jim Hall) - 5:12
 "Free Form" (Hamilton, Collette, Hall, Katz, Carson Smith) - 5:00
 "Walking Carson Blues" (Smith) - 6:08
 "Buddy Boo" (Collette) - 6:16
Recorded at The Strollers in Long Beach (tracks 6-10) and Radio Recorders in Hollywood (tracks 1-5)

Personnel
Chico Hamilton - drums
Buddy Collette - tenor saxophone, alto saxophone, flute, clarinet
Fred Katz - cello
Jim Hall - guitar
Carson Smith - bass

Uses in other media
 "The Sage" is featured in the 1997 film, Boogie Nights.
 "Blue Sands" is featured in the 2022 film, Licorice Pizza.

References 

Pacific Jazz Records albums
Chico Hamilton albums
1956 albums